Dicornua is a monotypic genus of Asian dwarf spiders containing the single species, Dicornua hikosanensis. It was first described by R. Oi in 1960, and has only been found in Japan.

See also
 List of Linyphiidae species

References

Linyphiidae
Monotypic Araneomorphae genera
Spiders of Asia